Borgo may refer to the following places:

Finland
 Borgå

France
 Borgo, Haute-Corse

Italy
 Borgo (rione of Rome), a rione in the City of Rome.
Borgo a Mozzano, in the province of Lucca
Borgo d'Ale, in the province of Vercelli
Borgo di Terzo, in the province of Bergamo
Borgo Pace, in the province of Pesaro e Urbino
Borgo Priolo, in the province of Pavia
Borgo San Dalmazzo, in the province of Cuneo
Borgo San Giacomo, in the province of Brescia
Borgo San Giovanni, in the province of Lodi
Borgo San Lorenzo, in the province of Florence
Borgo San Martino, in the province of Alessandria
Borgo San Siro, in the province of Pavia
Borgo Santa Lucia an historic rione in the City of Naples
Borgo Ticino, in the province of Novara
Borgo Tossignano, in the province of Bologna
Borgo Val di Taro, in the province of Parma
Borgo Valsugana, in the province of Trento
Borgo Velino, in the province of Rieti
Borgo Vercelli, in the province of Vercelli
Borgosesia, in the province of Vercelli
Borgomanero, in the province of Novara
Borgorose, in the province of Rieti

Malta
Birgu

Romania
Borgo Pass

San Marino
Borgo Maggiore